The winners are listed below:

External links
 https://web.archive.org/web/20110705085218/http://www.bollywoodawards.com/

See also
 Bollywood Movie Awards
 Bollywood
 Cinema of India

Bollywood Movie Awards